Alain Bombard (Paris, 27 October 1924 – Paris, 19 July 2005) was a French biologist, physician and politician famous for sailing in a small boat across the Atlantic Ocean without provision. He theorized that a human being could very well survive the trip across the ocean without provisions and decided to test his theory himself in order to save thousands of lives of people lost at sea.

He was a Member of the European Parliament from the Socialist Party for France from 1981 to 1994.

Life 
On 19 October 1952 Bombard began his solitary trip across the Atlantic Ocean to the West Indies, after visiting his newborn daughter in France. He had sailed in the Atlantic Ocean solo before, from Tangier to Casablanca (13-20 August) and from Casablanca to Las Palmas (24 August – 3 September). The original plan had been to sail across the Atlantic with a friend, English yachtsman Jack Palmer, with whom he sailed just before from Monaco to Menorca (5 May – 11 June) but Jack abandoned Alain in Tangier.

Bombard reports he survived by fishing (and using fish as source of both fresh water and food) with a self-made harpoon and hooks, and harvesting the surface plankton with a small net. He also drank a limited amount of seawater for a long period on his trip. On 23 October, the fourth day of the journey, Bombard had to mend a torn old sail, while the backup sail was blown away. He also made a major navigation mistake which made him believe that he was sailing much faster than he actually was. On the fifty-third day of the journey he encountered a ship. The crew told him that he was still over  short of his goal. However, after the ship's crew offered him a meal, Bombard decided to go on. Bombard reached Barbados on 23 December 1952, after  of travel. Bombard had lost  and was briefly hospitalized. He published a book about his trip entitled Naufragé Volontaire in 1953.

Bombard's claim was later tested and contested by Hannes Lindemann, a German physician, canoeist and sailing pioneer, although both the French and Taiwanese navies concurred with Bombard's findings, the Taiwanese exercise extending to 134 days. Lindemann wanted to repeat Bombard's trip in order to gain a better understanding of living on salt water and fish, but found that he needed fresh water (from rain) most days. Lindemann later claimed that Bombard had actually taken along fresh water and consumed it on the ocean, and that he had also been secretly provided further supplies during his voyage. Lindemann's own observations about reactions to scarce fresh water supplies became the basis for the World Health Organization's navigation recommendations. However, it appears that Bombard may have been misunderstood in regard to the possibility of survival without fresh water. Bombard never argued that human survival is possible only by drinking seawater. On the contrary, he indicated that seawater in small quantities can prolong survival if accompanied, if rainwater is not available, by the absorption of liquids present in the bodies of fish. On its own, he only claimed the seawater can extend the period of consciousness during which alternatives can be sought. Bombard's legacy is still debated; in any case, an inflatable survival raft is still very often called a "bombard" in French, in memory of the doctor's adventure in the Atlantic.

In 1958, Bombard and six men were testing a rubber dinghy in rough waters off of the coast of the French town of Étel when a wave capsized the craft.  A rescue crew of seven, standing by during test, came to Bombard's rescue in a lifeboat which was capsized by a huge wave that knocked nine of the 14 people on board overboard.  Bombard and four men were the only survivors.  

Bombard died in Toulon in 2005 at age 80.

Media appearances
Bombard was featured in an episode of the educational television program 3-2-1 Contact in 1986, in which he coaches two of the teenaged cast members on his life-raft survival techniques using a real raft on the open sea.

Books in English
 The Voyage of the Heretique, Simon and Schuster (1953) 
 The Bombard Story (1955) 
 Dr. Bombard Goes to Sea, Vanguard Press (1957)

In popular culture
 Alain Bombard is referenced in the Tintin story The Red Sea Sharks, where Tintin advises Captain Haddock to drink seawater, like Dr. Bombard did.

References

External links
 
 Bombard's obituary in Times Online
 Drinking Seawater - The story of Bombard and Lindemann

1924 births
2005 deaths
French biologists
French sailors
20th-century French physicians
20th-century French politicians
Physicians from Paris
20th-century biologists
Socialist Party (France) MEPs
MEPs for France 1979–1984
MEPs for France 1984–1989
MEPs for France 1989–1994